Zbigniew Franiak (born 18 June 1948) is a Polish football manager.

References

1948 births
Living people
Polish football managers
Lech Poznań managers
Zawisza Bydgoszcz managers
Polish footballers
Lech Poznań players
Footballers from Poznań
Association footballers not categorized by position